The GT-1 (Glide Torpedo 1) was an early form of stand-off weaponry developed by the United States Army Air Forces during World War II. Intended to deliver an aerial torpedo at a safe range from the launching aircraft, the weapon proved successful enough in testing to be approved for operational use, and the GT-1 saw limited use in the closing stages of the war.

Design and development
The GT-1 was derived from the GB-1 series of glide bombs, developed by Aeronca for the United States Army Air Forces. The weapon's airframe was inexpensive and simply designed, with a basic wing and twin tails attached to a cradle for carrying the payload. The flight path of the GT-1 was determined by a preset autopilot that kept the weapon on a steady course after release.

The GT-1's warload consisted of a Mark 13 Mod 2A aerial torpedo.

Operational history
Initially tested during 1943, the GT-1 proved to be successful, and was issued to a single operational unit for service. Launched from North American B-25 Mitchell bombers, the GT-1 saw brief operational service late in the war; three missions are known to have been flown using the weapon from Okinawa in late 1945. On one mission, against Kagoshima, eleven of thirteen GT-1s launched successfully entered the water; three hits were recorded, against a fleet carrier, a light carrier, and a freighter.  The Boeing B-17 Flying Fortress was also capable of carrying the GT-1.

Following the end of World War II, the aerial torpedo rapidly fell out of favor as a weapon of war against surface ships, and the 'GT' category of weapons was abolished in 1947.

See also
Project Kingfisher

References

Notes

Bibliography

External links

World War II guided missiles of the United States
Aerial torpedoes
Anti-ship missiles of the United States
GT-001
Weapons and ammunition introduced in 1944